"Gigolos Get Lonely Too" is the fifth track from the Time's six-song album, What Time Is It?.  One of the first songs recorded for the album, it was produced, arranged, composed and performed by Prince with Morris Day later adding his lead vocals.

The song is the album's only ballad, featuring a treated drum machine, as well as live drums. Keyboards and bass make up the remaining instrumentation with an understated guitar. Day sang and played drums, Jesse Johnson played guitar, and Prince played everything else. The single was backed with the album's closing track "I Don't Wanna Leave You".

The single reached number 77 on the R&B charts. A live recording of the song from 1998 was included on Morris Day's 2004 release, It's About Time.

A different mix of the song is heard on the posthumous Prince album Originals, released in 2019. This version has Prince on lead vocals and most instruments, Johnson on guitar and backing vocals, and Day on drums and backing vocals.

References

The Time (band) songs
1982 singles
Songs written by Prince (musician)
Song recordings produced by Prince (musician)
1981 songs
Warner Records singles